Jorge Lozano Armengol (born 11 March 1948) is a Mexican politician affiliated with the National Action Party. He served as Senator of the LVIII and LIX Legislatures of the Mexican Congress representing San Luis Potosí, as well as a local deputy in the LI Legislature of the Congress of San Luis Potosí.

References

1948 births
Living people
People from San Luis Potosí City
Members of the Senate of the Republic (Mexico)
National Action Party (Mexico) politicians
20th-century Mexican politicians
21st-century Mexican politicians
Politicians from San Luis Potosí
Universidad Autónoma de Guadalajara alumni
Members of the Congress of San Luis Potosí